The 42nd Venice Biennale, held in 1986, was an exhibition of international contemporary art, with 40 participating nations. The Venice Biennale takes place biennially in Venice, Italy. Prizewinners of the 42nd Biennale included: Frank Auerbach and Sigmar Polke (International Prize/Golden Lion), the French pavilion with Daniel Buren (best national representation), Nunzio Di Stefano (best young artist), and Golden Lion in memory of sculptor Fausto Melotti. These were the first Biennale prizes awarded since 1968.

Awards 

 International Prize/Golden Lion: Frank Auerbach and Sigmar Polke
 Golden Lion for best national representation: French pavilion with Daniel Buren
 Premio 2000 (young artist): Nunzio Di Stefano
 Golden Lion in memory of sculptor Fausto Melotti

References

Bibliography

Further reading 

 
 
 
 
 

1986 in art
1986 in Italy
Venice Biennale exhibitions